The term wired intelligence refers to a robot that has no programmed microprocessor.  Instead, the robot has a particular connection of wires and analog electronics between its sensors and motors that gives it seemingly intelligent actions.  These actions can be complex enough to create a quadruped robot that seeks out the brightest light source.

The groundwork for these theories is laid in "Vehicles: Experiments in Synthetic Psychology" by Valentino Braitenberg.

See also
 BEAM robotics

Robotics